That's What Love Songs Often Do is an album by the American alternative rock band Fig Dish, released in 1995. "Seeds" was the first single released from the album. That's What Love Songs Often Do was a commercial disappointment.

Production
The band recorded the album in three weeks, immediately after being signed by Polydor Records. It was produced by Lou Giordano.

Critical reception

The Morning Call called the album "an exemplary collection of modern-day Chicago rock," writing that "the strong guitar melodies of Blake Smith and Rick Ness complement their equally intricate vocal melodies, and the tongue-in-cheek approach taken to hint at the horrid keeps the recording fun, never tedious." Trouser Press wrote: "Able to conjure up a potent haze of slacker sloth and then obliterate it with a fierce rock assault (see 'It’s Your Ceiling' for a concise demonstration), Fig Dish keeps attitude out of the effort, concentrating on simply effective tunes." 

CMJ New Music Monthly deemed it "a respectably tight-fisted punch of buzzing guitar caterwaul." The Chicago Tribune called it "a minor revelation," and praised the "sturdy melodies, concisely and smartly arranged." The Washington Post judged That's What Love Songs Often Do to be "lively pop-grunge with more than a touch of Nirvana's swirling feedback and woozy despair."

AllMusic wrote that the album delivers "solid alternative pop with a big guitar sound." In a retrospective feature, the Riverfront Times called "Bury Me" "a sub-three-minute nerd-rock waltz with interesting arrangements (i.e., a bridge that slows down dramatically, before speeding up again in a drumming fury) and the plaintive (and effective) call, 'Wanna be with you!'"

Track listing

References

1995 albums
Atlas Records albums